Sarah Guppy, née Beach (5 November 1770 – 24 August 1852) was an English inventor and the first woman to patent a bridge, in 1811. She developed a range of other domestic and marine products.

Following the publication of an erroneous entry in the ONDB in 2016, now corrected Guppy has in recent times been incorrectly credited with the design of Isambard Kingdom Brunel's Clifton Suspension Bridge. She patented her ideas for a chain bridge in 1811 (before the announcement of the first competition for a bridge across the Avon Gorge) but this design was never realised. Brunel’s winning design for a bridge across the Avon Gorge differed from Guppy's patent in several significant ways: it had a deck suspended from flat wrought iron bar links rather than resting on top of chains like Guppy's; and it did not feature riverbed foundations (a key component of Guppy's design) as it was constructed on rock, 75 metres above high tide where the piers were not at risk of damage from water erosion.

Sarah Guppy was very selfless in her invention process, and cared more for the greater good of the public than for her own personal gain or credit. For example, while she contributed significantly to the design of Thomas Telford’s Menai Bridge, Sarah waived the fees for Telford’s use of her ideas (Higgitt, 2016). She contributed the majority to this bridge design, however personal profit was not the priority (Higgitt, 2016).

Early history and inventions

Sarah Maria Beach was born in Birmingham, England, and baptised in November 1770 as a daughter of Richard and Mary Beach.  She married Samuel Guppy in 1795. In 1811 she patented the first of her inventions, a method of making safe piling for bridges. Thomas Telford asked her for permission to use her patented design for suspension bridge foundations, and she granted it to him free of charge. As a friend of Isambard Kingdom Brunel and his family she became involved in the Great Western Railway, writing to the directors with ideas and giving her support. In 1841 she wrote a letter recommending planting willows and poplars to stabilise embankments. She continued to offer technical advice despite the fact that, as she wrote, "it is unpleasant to speak of oneself—it may seem boastful particularly in a woman."

Sarah’s early life helped pave the way for future success and access to resources that other females of her time did not have. Sarah Guppy grew up in a wealthy family, and was educated and surrounded by innovative thinkers (Pollard, 2021). When she married Samuel Guppy, who was a machinery builder, she was surrounded by the trade and learned how to negotiate and run a business, while simultaneously learning about the engineering industry (Pollard, 2021). Since Samuel had interest in numerous fields, Sarah wanted to get involved and Samuel supported his wife in taking charge of negotiations for his manufacturing business deals (Pollard, 2021). It was clear that Sarah Guppy’s interest in engineering was well supported by her husband, who cared for her and did not treat her as secondary or less capable of entering a field that so many women are historically blocked off from.

Patents and publications

The family took out 10 patents in the first half of the nineteenth century, including a method of keeping ships free of barnacles that led to a government contract worth £40,000. Other inventions included a bed with built-in exercise equipment, a device for a tea or coffee urn which would cook eggs in the steam as well as having a small dish to keep toast warm, and a device for "improvements in caulking ships, boats and other vessels." In later life she wrote The Cottagers and Labourers Friend and Dialogues for Children, invented the fire hood or Cook's Comforter, and patented a new type of candlestick that enabled candles to burn longer.

A key barrier to Sarah Guppy’s success as an inventor was that she could not file for a patent under her own name. During this period, patents were considered valuable, as they contained intellectual property (HLB, 2019). She patented “New Mode of Constructing and Erecting Bridges and Railroads without Arches,” which turned out to be very ahead of her time, and seven years before Thomas Telford’s start on the suspension bridge (HLB, 2019). When Guppy granted Telford permission to use her design and ideas for free, there is little evidence that he or other engineers ever acknowledged her invention and gave her due credit (HLB, 2019).  Sarah Guppy has been overlooked for her work in bridge engineering advancements, because her steps as a woman were taken over by big names in the engineering world, specifically male engineers. 
Something less publicized on Sarah Guppy was her active role in the social sphere, and philanthropic contributions to education and female education. Guppy published pamphlets relating to public health issues, agriculture, edicuation, and animal welfare (Higgitt, 2016). Additionally, Sarah Guppy cared for the welfare of vulnerable groups, and used her platform and voice to encourage progress and positive change towards a more equitable society (Higgitt, 2016).

Marriage and family

After marrying Bristol merchant Samuel Guppy they lived in Queen Square and Prince Street, a leading light of the Bristol and Clifton social scene. The couple had six children, including Thomas Richard, who with older brother Samuel operated the Friars Sugar Refinery in Bristol (1826–42) before becoming an engineer and associate of Brunel, contributing significantly to the design of SS Great Western and SS Great Britain. Brunel painted a portrait of the younger Sarah Guppy c. 1836.

Later life

In 1837 the widowed Sarah, now 67, married Richard Eyre Coote, 28 years her junior. For a while they lived at Arnos Court, Brislington, but Richard ran through his rich wife's money at a rapid rate, spending on horses and neglecting her. Sarah moved into 7 Richmond Hill, Clifton, in 1842. She bought the land opposite the house for the benefit of Clifton residents and it still remains green space.

Sarah Guppy’s later life is somewhat scandalous and unfortunate, as she had a second marriage to a man thirty years younger than herself (Mason, 2022). Her life ended quite sadly, as a widow who married this young man who then proceeded to gamble away and waste Sarah’s hard earned money (Pollard, 2021). She left Richard Coote and lived solo before passing away (HLB, 2019). Sarah, an incredibly inspiring woman who brought more to the world than her bridge engineering she is now known for, passed away at age 81 in 1852 with only 200 pounds to her name (Pollard, 2021).

Legacy and Impact on Modern Society
Female innovators in the 19th century are often overlooked, because even to enter the innovation space in the first place, these women had to have more than just an idea. Sarah Guppy used her resources to the maximum, and combined with her motivation, drive, and curiosity. She was eccentric and did not let gender roles take away from her opportunities to take action on her ideas and make an impact on society. Today, her early suspension bridge design has paved the way for modern infrastructure, and her ideas formed the baseline to be built upon. The Clifton Suspension Bridge would not exist without Sarah Guppy, and her modesty to not take full credit because of her passion to make a positive change for the world.

Notes and references

British bridge engineers
Structural engineers
People of the Industrial Revolution
British railway civil engineers
19th-century British inventors
Women inventors
British women engineers
1770 births
1852 deaths
People from Birmingham, West Midlands
19th-century English businesspeople
People from Clifton, Bristol
Engineers from the West Midlands (county)
19th-century English businesswomen
18th-century English women
19th-century British engineers